The Way is a 2017 South Korean drama film directed by Jung In-bong. The film stars Kim Hye-ja, Song Jae-ho and Heo Jin.

Plot
Three interlocking stories whose characters dream of a new start and love: Soon-ae, who lives alone; Sang-bum, who has spent his entire life supporting his family; and Su-mi, who is recovering from a tragedy.

Cast
Kim Hye-ja as Soon-ae 
Song Jae-ho as Sang-bum
Heo Jin as Su-mi
On Joo-wan
Ji An as Sang-bum's first love
Kim Ji-sung as Young Soon-ae 
Lee Seong-deuk
Park Hyeok-kwon
Kim Seung-hyeon as Joong-gwang
Ahn Hye-kyeong as Byung-chul's wife
Shin Won-ho as Yoon-suk 
Yoon Seo as Sang-bum's granddaughter

References

External links

2017 films
South Korean drama films
2017 drama films
2010s Korean-language films
2010s South Korean films